Claudia Unger (born  1977) is a German former competitive figure skater. She finished 11th at the 1990 World Junior Championships in Colorado Springs, Colorado and 12th at the 1991 World Junior Championships in Budapest. She has coached at TEC Waldau in Stuttgart since 2003. She is also an ISU technical specialist.

Competitive highlights

References 

1970s births
German female single skaters
Living people
Sportspeople from Stuttgart